The London, Midland and Scottish Railway (LMS) Ivatt Class 2 2-6-0 is a class of steam locomotive designed for light mixed traffic.

Design
Elderly 0-6-0s formed the backbone of the low-powered locomotives within the LMS fleet. William Stanier had concentrated on introducing larger engines and it was left to George Ivatt to introduce a new class of low-powered locomotive. He designed a tender version of the Ivatt Class 2 2-6-2T, introduced at the same time, which was inspired by the Stanier Class 3 2-6-2T, which was inspired by the Fowler Class 3 2-6-2T. So they were well-suited to their task and, following attention to draughting problems by both Derby and Swindon, quickly became a success. Further engines of this type were built as the BR Standard Class 2 2-6-0, these locomotives having BR standard fittings and a modified cab and tender profile to allow completely unrestricted route availability; both LMS and BR 2MT moguls are often nicknamed "Mickey Mouse".

Construction
A total of 128 were built between 1946 and 1953, mostly at Crewe.  20 were built by LMS and given the numbers 6400–19. On nationalisation in 1948 40000 was added to their numbers to become 46400–19. The LMS classified them 2F, BR as 2MT.

The 38 members of the Darlington-built batch (46465 to 46502) were allocated to the Eastern and North Eastern Regions of British Railways.  The final 25 (46503 to 46527) were built at Swindon Works and, being allocated to the Western Region, consequently carried the GWR-type vacuum ejector and firehole doors.  The Swindon locomotives were turned out, initially, in lined black. Under the Hanks regime, some received lined green livery as they passed through works. The rest carried black livery.  None of the class was named in service, however some have been named in preservation.

Withdrawal
The class was withdrawn between 1961 and 1967.

Accidents & Incidents
On 27 April 2013, No. 46521 derailed on the trap points at Quorn and Woodhouse on the Great Central Railway following a misunderstanding between the signalman and the locomotive's crew. The derailment was captured on video by a visitor and subsequently posted on YouTube. Nobody was injured, and the locomotive was recovered using a crane; it was then towed back to the shed by BR Class 45 No. D123. Almost one month after the incident, the locomotive returned to service.

Preservation
Seven members of the class have been preserved, five built at Crewe Works and two built at Swindon Works. Of the seven engines preserved, six have run in preservation (46428 is undergoing restoration from scrapyard condition to working order at the East Lancs Railway). Three members of the class have also operated on the mainline in preservation: No's 46441, 46443 & 46521. Three of them were purchased from British Railways while the other four preserved examples were rescued from Barry Scrapyard throughout the 1970s. The ones rescued from Barry Scrapyard include No. 46428, No. 46447, No. 46512, and No. 46521. The ones sold directly into preservation from British Railways include No. 46441, No. 46443, and No. 46464.

46443 became a popular mainline engine in the 1980s when it was one of the engines used during the 150th anniversary of the Great Western Railway traveling along many old branchlines including the old Bristol Harbour Railway. 46521 saw use on the mainline in the 1990s but only saw a limited amount of use hauling excursion trains with one of its runs being on the GWML in December 1994.. 46441 was one of the smallest tender engines to operate on the former BR system during the 1990s. As well as being a regular at Carnforth and working at its home on the East Lancashire Railway it was also used for the regular steam on the met programme working trains alongside other steam engines. 46441 in recent years has been on static display inside the museum at the Ribble Steam Railway in Preston awaiting an overhaul. In April 2018 the engine was moved by road to its new home at the Lakeside and Haverthwaite Railway, it is presently the only tender engine based at the railway. The locos current owner Chris Beet who also owns LMS Jubilee no 45690 Leander is having the engine overhauled for use on the railway but it will not be returning to the mainline.

* Named in preservation

Only 46428 has yet to steam in preservation.

Models 
Several 00 gauge ready-to-run models of the locomotive have been produced. In 1975, Hornby Railways produced a model of the class, in British Railways lined black (mixed traffic) livery. A BR lined green version followed in 1978. They were on sale until 1982. In 2007 Bachmann Branchline introduced a more detailed model, available in several liveries including LMS unlined black, BR lined black and BR lined Brunswick Green, the latter livery of which was used for a model of now preserved 46521. Graham Farish produces several of the same liveries in N gauge. Comet Models produce an all-metal kit.

In fiction 
No. 46521 appeared in the sitcom Oh, Doctor Beeching!. It was for this that it received the name 'Blossom'.

Both 46443 and 46521 appeared in the 1976 Universal Pictures film The Seven-Per-Cent Solution. For this role both locomotives were heavily disguised to have a European flavour.

Both "Oh, Doctor Beeching!" and "The Seven-Per-Cent Solution" were filmed on the Severn Valley Railway.

References

External links

The Carmyllie Pilot Company Limited (owners of 46464)

2 Ivatt Class 2 2-6-0
2-6-0 locomotives
Preserved London, Midland and Scottish Railway steam locomotives
Railway locomotives introduced in 1946
Standard gauge steam locomotives of Great Britain